The NCAA Gerald R. Ford Award was named in recognition of Gerald Ford, the 38th President of the United States.  Presented by the National Collegiate Athletic Association, the award honors an individual who has provided significant leadership in the role of advocate for intercollegiate athletics and has done so on a continuous basis over the course of his or her career.  Ford played the position of center in football at the University of Michigan, participating on national championship teams in 1932 and 1933.  He turned down offers from Green Bay Packers and Detroit Lions to study law at Yale University.  The Gerald Ford Award was first awarded in 2004.

Recipients
The recipients of the award are:

 2004: Theodore Hesburgh
 2005: William C. Friday
 2006: Birch Bayh & John Wooden
 2007: Christine Grant
 2008: James Frank
 2009: Billie Jean King
 2010: Myles Brand 
 2011: Joe Paterno
 2012: Pat Summitt
 2013: Donna Lopiano
 2014: James Andrews
 2015: Walter Harrison
 2016: Condoleezza Rice
 2017: Grant Hill
 2018: Robin Roberts
 2019: Jackie Joyner-Kersee
 2020: Dick Vitale
 2021: David Robinson
 2022: Ann Meyers Drysdale

In July 2012, following the Penn State child sex abuse scandal, the NCAA vacated the 2011 award given to Joe Paterno.

See also
 NCAA Award of Valor
 NCAA Inspiration Award
 NCAA Sportsmanship Award
 NCAA Woman of the Year Award
 Silver Anniversary Awards (NCAA)

References

External links
 

College sports trophies and awards in the United States
Gerald R. Ford Award